The Ministry of Transport is a government ministry of Tunisia. The ministry offices are located in Tunis, along Avenue Mohamed Bouazizi, near Tunis Carthage Airport. As of 2020 Moez Chakchouk is the minister.

The Direction Générale de l’Aviation Civile (DGAC) serves as Tunisia's civil aviation authority and as the accident investigation agency of civil aircraft accidents.

Agencies
 Tunisian Civil Aviation and Airports Authority

References

External links

 Ministry of Transport 
 Ministry of Transport 

Tunisia
Transport
Organizations investigating aviation accidents and incidents
Tunisia
Transport organisations based in Tunisia